Ulan-Ude Aviation Plant (UUAZ, Ulan-Udėnskij aviacionný zavod) is a Russian joint-stock company specializing in aircraft manufacturing. It is based in Ulan-Ude, Buryatia.

History
The company was founded in 1939 for repair services of I-16 fighters and SB bombers. During World War II, it produced La-5 and La-7 fighter airplanes. In 1956, the factory stepped into the epoch of helicopter production. A considerable part of the factory's history is devoted to manufacture of the most selling Mi-8 helicopter, started in 1970. The factory has produced over 4000 Mi-8 helicopters altogether.

In 2008, the company was given the annual "Russia's best exporter of the year" award by Ministry of Economic Development and Trade of Russian Federation.

Production
 its main products include Mi-8Т, Mi-171, Мi-171Sh helicopters. The company also produces household items.

Ownership
Major shareholders in 2009:
 OPK Oboronprom 75.09%
 DCC 12.56%
 Leader IPF Gasfund 5.25%
 Other 7.10%

References

External links 
 Official site of UUAZ
 Mi-171 photos at UUAZ
 Mi-8AMTSh/Mi-171 specifications

Russian Helicopters
Aircraft manufacturers of the Soviet Union
Helicopter manufacturers of the Soviet Union
Companies based in Ulan-Ude